Katers Island is an uninhabited island located in the Kimberley region of Western Australia.

A new species of Rock Wallaby, Petrogale burbidgei. was discovered on Katers and other islands in the archipelago in 1977.

References 

Islands of the Kimberley (Western Australia)
Uninhabited islands of Australia